Antioch, also known as Anti, is an unincorporated community in Cass County, Texas on Farm to Market road 96. The town had a church from 1856, and a post office was added in 1888.  The population is 45.

References

Unincorporated communities in Cass County, Texas
Unincorporated communities in Texas